Berinsfield is an English village and civil parish in South Oxfordshire, about  southeast of Oxford. The 2011 Census recorded the parish population as 2,806.

History
Palaeolithic and Roman artefacts were found during 20th century excavations to build the village. The Roman road between Dorchester-on-Thames and Alchester runs through the centre of Berinsfield. An Anglo-Saxon cemetery was also found at Berinsfield. The village is on the site of RAF Mount Farm, a satellite of RAF Benson, initially used to train bomber pilots. It was later taken over by the United States Army Air Forces, who used it as a reconnaissance base. From here stars including Bob Hope, Dorothy Lamour and Glenn Miller took off to entertain the troops in Europe. Miller performed for the US service personnel at the base in December 1944 before his fateful flight from RAF Twinwood Farm which disappeared en route to Paris.

After World War II the disused airbase was occupied by squatters, some of whom stayed for over a decade until, in 1957, the Air Ministry sold the airfield for civilian use. Bullingdon Rural District Council decided to build a new council estate to be named after Birinus or Berin, a local saint. The word 'field' was added because the Americans called their base an airfield. Many new residents at that time lived in the former Royal Air Force huts until brick-built houses were constructed on the site. Berinsfield is the first English village to be built on virgin land for more than 200 years. It was designed by the architect and town planner William Holford in 1960. The Church of England parish church of Saint Mary and Saint Berin was designed by Rev. Harold Best, vicar of Dorchester, and built in 1962.

Amenities
Berinsfield has a primary school, a public library, The Abbey Sports Centre, a row of shops including a post office. Berinsfield Football Club previously played in the Reading Football League but have since transferred to the North Berks Football League as a result of their position in Oxfordshire. There is a Berinsfield Amateur Boxing Club. Berinsfield has a Women's Institute. Berinsfield also had a youth club, Berry Youth Club, for 10 to 21-year-olds. Thames Travel bus routes X38, X39 and X40 indirectly serve Berinsfield. Between them they give the village links to Oxford, Reading and Wallingford seven days a week and also Henley-on-Thames from Mondays to Saturdays.

Gallery

References

Sources

External links
Berinsfield Parish Council

Civil parishes in Oxfordshire
Villages in Oxfordshire